Merja Kuusisto (born 4 December 1954 in Hausjärvi) is a Finnish politician. From 2007 to 2015 she was a member of the Parliament of Finland from the Uuismaa constituency. She lives in Tuusula and is a qualified specialist nurse.  She and her husband, Päivön, have two daughters. Prior to her election to Parliament, Kuusisto was Chairwoman of the Tuusula municipal council, to which she was first elected in 1985, from 2001 to 2006. Kuusisto is a member of the Social Democratic Party of Finland.
da av2221 page example 101

References

1954 births
Living people
People from Hausjärvi
Social Democratic Party of Finland politicians
Members of the Parliament of Finland (2007–11)
Members of the Parliament of Finland (2011–15)
Finnish nurses
20th-century Finnish women politicians
21st-century Finnish women politicians
Women members of the Parliament of Finland